Gisèle Printz (born 27 June 1933) is a former member of the Senate of France, who represented the Moselle department.  She is a member of the Socialist Party.

References
Page on the Senate website 

1933 births
Living people
French Senators of the Fifth Republic
Socialist Party (France) politicians
Women members of the Senate (France)
Senators of Moselle (department)
Place of birth missing (living people)